Peter Wibrån (born 23 September 1969) is a Swedish former professional footballer who played as a midfielder.

Wibrån grew up in Lammhult near Växjö and began his professional career at Öster. In 1996, he signed for Helsingborgs IF, a club where he spent three successful years before moving to German Bundesliga club FC Hansa Rostock. In 2003, Wibrån decided to return to Sweden and Öster.

He won ten caps for the Sweden national team between 1995 and 1997.

References

External links
 
 
 

1969 births
Living people
People from Växjö
Sportspeople from Kronoberg County
Swedish footballers
Association football midfielders
Sweden international footballers
Allsvenskan players
Bundesliga players
Östers IF players
Helsingborgs IF players
FC Hansa Rostock players
Swedish expatriate footballers
Swedish expatriate sportspeople in Germany
Expatriate footballers in Germany